The Houston Film Critics Society Award for Best Actress is an annual award given by the Houston Film Critics Society.

Winners
 † = Winner of the Academy Award for Best Actress
 ‡ = Nominated of the Academy Award for Best Actress

2000s

2010s

2020s

References
 Houston Film Critics Society official website

A
Film awards for lead actress